Johnny Grey (born 1951) is a British designer, author and educator specializing in kitchens; he has authored five books.

Early life and education 
Grey studied architecture at the Architectural Association from 1970 to 1976 (AA Dip Arch), with tutors Jeremy Dixon and Mike Gold. One of the first kitchens he designed was for his aunt, the food writer Elizabeth David.

Career

Early kitchen design 
Whilst studying architecture, Grey focused on craft aspects of historic buildings. He also dealt in and restored 18th-century furniture alongside his brother. After graduating he made furniture and kitchens in his family's barn in Sussex. His career took off with a 1980 Sunday Times article, "Why this awful fixation with fitted kitchens?".

Johnny Grey Studios 
Grey's studio adapts interiors into sociable kitchens, "living rooms in which you cook", that are linked to the garden and outdoor spaces. Architecture, product and lighting design form the work, which is based on insights from neuroscience. Each project is an individual case, and the studio has worked for residential clients all over the world.

Grey ran a showroom and studio at the San Francisco Design Center from 1990 to 1997 and currently collaborates in the US with Kevin Hackett of SiolArchitects. Over thirty JG projects have been installed across the country, including showcase houses in San Francisco and New York.
With a focus now on socially aware design projects for corporate and charitable organizations, Grey is currently working with the 4G Kitchen Consortium and the National Innovation Centre for Ageing (NICA) and Newcastle University.

Design innovations 
In the late 1970s he adapted the end-grain butchers’ block for domestic use, incorporating it into a piece of furniture, often with a drawer or two. He launched the Unfitted Kitchen in 1984. Made from freestanding furniture, this was an unorthodox idea for its time.  The now-widespread use of willow baskets as drawers was first invented by Grey in the Unfitted Kitchen. Willow baskets in cabinetry were registered for copyright by Grey jointly with Smallbone in 1987, though Mark Wilkinson objected that basketry can be traced to historic African applications.

Grey includes a central island wherever possible.

Grey incorporated Alexander Technique theory in kitchen design with individually customized dimensions for counter tops and sink and dishwasher placement.  Dedicated work surfaces, or task-driven areas, further this approach. Low-level counters for smaller appliances (and children's cooking) and raised-height dishwashers are now widespread in kitchens.

'Soft Geometry' describes Grey's move towards curved furniture inspired by the relationship between peripheral vision and body movement. In the mid 2000s his meeting with neuroscientist and sociologist John Zeisel brought new insights into making kitchens into 'happy spaces'. 'The living room in which you cook' (2014) restricts the culinary zone to leave room for other sociable activities.  Eye contact as key to design was another neuroscience-inspired idea, alongside the identification of each kitchen's 'sweet spot' as the location for a key piece of furniture such as the central island.

Commercial influence 

Worldwide, Johnny Grey Studios have sold kitchens worth £60 million. Precise figures are not available for Unfitted Kitchens sold by Smallbone but sales would likely be in excess of £25 million. If the value of products that inspired the kitchen industry sector such as willow baskets, curved furniture, end-grain blocks, plate racks, inlaid framed doors and other culinary design details were included, this figure would be substantially increased.

Johnny Grey’s vision has also shaped kitchen design at a detailed level. He devised V-groove door panels to make composite doors appear framed, suitcase-style door handles, ergonomics based on flexed elbow measurements, raised height dishwashers and freestanding kitchen furniture with specific functional features. He brought to this marketplace pattern, colour, soft shapes, multiple work surface levels on central islands and throughout the kitchen, the mixing of materials, reintroduction of homely features and normalisation of kitchens as sociable living rooms.

Author 
Grey's first book The Art of Kitchen Design (Cassell 1994, in print for 14 years) includes the social history of the kitchen. In 1997 Cassell published The Hardworking House, a collection of essays on the history of home design. In 1997 The Kitchen Workbook was also published in a series of home design books for Dorling Kindersley, later incorporated into DK’s The Complete Home Design Workbook (1998). Grey's Kitchen Culture was published in 2004 with English, American, Russian and Asian editions.

Education and teaching 
In 2012 Grey was appointed Visiting Professor of Design and Kitchen Culture at Bucks New University. He wrote their kitchen design foundation degree course with Professor Alison Shreeve. The programme covers interior design, architecture, furniture and product design, design history, kitchen culture, marketing, social media, business and project management. It was launched in 2013 as a blended format, the first students graduating in 2017. He resigned from the university in October 2020 and has no connection with the current course.

In 2017, Grey collaborated with Sevra Davis, director of education at the Royal Society of Arts, and Professor Peter Gore and Patrick Bonnet from the National Innovation Centre for Ageing in Newcastle, to extend accessible design education into kitchen design and assist with changing the language of disability and ageing design to focus on multi-generational design. Together they developed the Student Design Challenge: Eat, Share, Live. Grey obtained sponsorship from AEG, Blum UK, Blanco, Kesseboehmer GmbH, the Office of Disability Issues and Symphony kitchens to fund the challenge. It was followed in 2019 with the next RSA Student Design Challenge, Beyond the Kitchen Table. Students were asked to devise convivial spaces for people of diverse ages and needs in which to prepare food and eat, entertain, engage in hobbies or work and enjoy being together. In 2020 Grey obtained sponsorship from Legal and General Capital for the RSA’s Cultivating Community brief to explore re-imagining common spaces and building diverse communities around food, taking the principles of kitchen design into the public realm. Social Eating workshops were run by Grey in Barking and Nottingham, in conjunction with Company Drinks and scholar-activist Marsha Smith.

Awards 
Grey received the Simon Taylor Lifetime Achievement Award (2008) from Designer Kitchen and Bathroom for outstanding contribution to the British kitchen and bathroom industry. and Designer Kitchen and Bathroom’s Service to Industry Award in 2016.
In September 2021, Grey was awarded a Special Achievement Award at the kbbreview Retail & Design Awards.

References

External links
 Official website

1951 births
Living people
Academics of the University of Salford
Architects from Sussex